Nicholas County is a county located in the U.S. state of Kentucky. As of the 2020 census, the population was 7,537. Its county seat is Carlisle, which is also the only incorporated community in the county. Founded in 1799, the county is named for Col. George Nicholas, the "Father of the Kentucky Constitution."

History
Nicholas County was established in 1799 from land given by Bourbon and Mason counties. Nicholas was the 42nd Kentucky county in order of formation.
The general region is noted for its scenic beauty, history, horse farms, and hospitality. Nicholas County has a picturesque, rural character. Its rolling countryside is typical of the Bluegrass belt where winding roads lead past manicured farms, through wooded glades and small villages.
Nicholas County is home to Forest Retreat, listed on the National Historic register as a historic district, built in 1814 by Thomas Metcalf the 10th Governor of Kentucky. The 1954 Kentucky Derby Winner “Determine” was bred and born in Nicholas County on the Forest Retreat Farm.
Daniel Boone's last Kentucky home place is also located in Nicholas County, the Historic marker is located on US HWY 68 just past the traffic islands heading north. Built by Boone in 1795, Boone and his family resided in the one room cabin until 1799.
Blue Licks Battlefield State Resort Park is a park located near Mount Olivet, Kentucky in Robertson and Nicholas counties. The park encompasses  and features a monument commemorating the August 19, 1782 Battle of Blue Licks. The battle was regarded as the final battle of the American Revolutionary War.

Geography 

Adjacent counties
 Robertson County  (north)
 Fleming County  (northeast)
 Bath County  (southeast)
 Bourbon County  (southwest)
 Harrison County  (northwest)

Demographics 

As of the census of 2010, there were 7,135 people, 2,809 households, and 1,956 families residing in the county. The racial makeup of the county was 97.9% White, 0.6% Black or African American, 0.1% Native American, 0.2% Asian, 0.5% from other races, and 0.7% from two or more races.  1.4% of the population were Hispanic or Latino of any race.

There were 2,809 households, out of which 29.20% had children under the age of 18 living with them, 52.60% were married couples living together, 11.10% had a female householder with no husband present, 5.9% had a male householder with no wife present, and 30.40% were non-families. 25.60% of all households were made up of individuals, and 11.30% had someone living alone who was 65 years of age or older.  The average household size was 2.51 and the average family size was 2.97.

In the county, the population was spread out, with 26.40% under the age of 19, 4.8% from 20 to 24, 25.50% from 25 to 44, 27.8% from 45 to 64, and 15.60% who were 65 years of age or older.  The median age was 40.5 years. For every 100 females there were 93.70 males.  For every 100 females age 18 and over, there were 89.30 males.

The median income for a household in the county was $40,259, and the median income for a family was $43,410.  The per capita income for the county was $18,452.  About 9.70% of families and 13.20% of the population were below the poverty line, including 14.20% of those under age 18 and 16.80% of those age 65 or over.

Politics

Communities
 Carlisle (county seat)
 East Union
 Headquarters
 Hooktown
 Moorefield
 Myers

Notable residents 
 Barton Stone Alexander, born in Nicholas County, brigadier general in the American Civil War, designer of Fort McPherson
 Daniel Boone,  moved to Nicholas County in 1795 after living in the Kanawha Valley, Virginia. Circa 1798, Boone moved to the mouth of the Little Sandy River at the site of present-day Greenup, Kentucky. Boone left Kentucky with his extended family for Missouri in 1799. While in Nicholas County, Boone lived on the Brushy Fork of Hinkston Creek in a cabin owned by his son Daniel Morgan Boone.
 Thomas Metcalfe (March 20, 1780 – August 18, 1855), also known as Thomas Metcalf or as "Stonehammer", was a U.S. Representative, Senator, and the tenth Governor of Kentucky. He was the first gubernatorial candidate in the state's history to be chosen by a nominating convention rather than a caucus. He was also the first governor of Kentucky who was not a member of the Democratic-Republican Party, Metcalfe's primary concern as governor was the issue of internal improvements. Among his proposed projects were a road connecting Shelbyville to Louisville and a canal on the Falls of the Ohio. When President Andrew Jackson vetoed funds to construct a turnpike connecting Maysville and Lexington, Metcalfe built it anyway, paying for it entirely with state funds. Following his term as governor, he served in the state senate, and completed the unfinished term of John J. Crittenden in the U.S. Senate in 1848. After this, he retired to "Forest Retreat", his estate in Nicholas County, where he died of cholera in 1855. Metcalfe County, Kentucky was named in his honor.
 Author Barbara Kingsolver was raised in Carlisle, Nicholas County.
 Joseph Drake was born in Nicholas County. Drake was a lawyer, plantation owner, and Colonel in the Confederate States Army during the Civil War.
 David Rice Atchison (1807-1886) lived for a brief period in Nicholas County and holds the distinction of (possibly) being President of the United States for one day. Zachary Taylor was supposed to be inaugurated on March 4, 1849, but refused to hold the inauguration on a Sunday. Vice President Millard Fillmore was also unable to be inaugurated on that day, so according to the rules of succession at that time, the President pro tempore of the U.S. Senate (the position held by Atchison) became the president. Although he was never sworn in - a requirement for serving as president - Atchison's grave marker bears the inscription, "President of the United States for One Day."

See also

 National Register of Historic Places listings in Nicholas County, Kentucky

References

External links
 Visit Carlisle & Nicholas County, KY

 
Kentucky counties
Counties of Appalachia
1799 establishments in Kentucky
Populated places established in 1799